The 2020–21 Serie A (known as the Serie A TIM for sponsorship reasons) was the 119th season of top-tier Italian football, the 89th in a round-robin tournament, and the 11th since its organization under an own league committee, the Lega Serie A. 

Following Atalanta's draw with Sassuolo on 2 May 2021, Internazionale were confirmed as champions for the first time since the 2009–10 Serie A, ending Juventus' run of nine consecutive titles.

Teams
Twenty teams competed in the league—the top seventeen teams from the previous season and three teams promoted from Serie B. Benevento (on 29 June 2020) and Crotone (on 24 July 2020) were the two teams directly promoted from Serie B, both after a two-year absence. On 20 August 2020, Spezia won the play-offs to earn its first promotion to Serie A; they became the 66th team to participate in the Italian top-level league.

Impact of the COVID-19 pandemic
A day following the Napoli–Genoa match on 27 September 2020, Genoa announced that fourteen of their players tested positive for COVID-19. The Genoa–Torino match scheduled for 3 October was thereby postponed.

On 3 October, two Napoli players, Piotr Zieliński and Elif Elmas, tested positive for COVID-19, and after the denial of the authorization to leave Naples by the Local Health Authority (ASL), Napoli blocked their players' departure for the match in Turin against Juventus. The Lega Serie A decided not to postpone the match scheduled for 4 October 2020. On the day of the game, Juventus took the field, in the absence their opponents who were in a state of quarantine in Naples. On 14 October, Juventus were awarded a 3–0 victory by default, and Napoli docked one point as the Disciplinary Commission ruled Napoli did not follow the COVID-19 pandemic protocol. Following a successful appeal by Napoli to the CONI Sports Guarantee Board, these penalties were overturned on 22 December. The match was eventually recovered on 7 April 2021, more than six months after its originally scheduled date.

Stadiums and locations

Number of teams by region

Personnel and kits

Managerial changes

League table

Results

Players' awards

MVP of the Month

Seasonal awards

Season statistics

Top goalscorers

Hat-tricks

Note
(H) – Home  (A) – Away

Top assists

Clean sheets

Discipline

Player
 Most yellow cards: 14
 Pasquale Schiattarella (Benevento)

 Most red cards: 2
 Rodrigo De Paul (Udinese)
 Charalampos Lykogiannis (Cagliari)

Team
 Most yellow cards: 100
Lazio
 Most red cards: 6
Juventus
 Fewest yellow cards: 59
Internazionale
 Fewest red cards: 1
Hellas Verona
Parma

Notes

Footnotes

References

External links

Official website
Serie A at ESPN.com

 

Serie A seasons
Italy
1